Cofralandes, Chilean Rhapsody is an experimental four-part 2002 Franco-Chilean digital video series written and directed by Raúl Ruiz for the Chilean Ministry of Education. The first part won the Glauber Rocha Award for the Best Film from Latin America and a FIPRESCI Award at the Montreal World Film Festival in 2002 "for the director's personal exploration into his homeland, using DV in a rigorous yet playful manner".

Cast

 Bernard Pautrat as Bernard
 Raúl Ruiz as narrator
 Malcolm Coad as English journalist
 Rainer Krause as German artist
 Ignacio Agüero as Rafael
 Mario Montilles as old Rafael
 Marcial Edwards as a guide in the Museum of Nothing
 Javier Maldonado as a guide in the Museum of the Sandwich
 Francisco Reyes as patriotic priest
 Amparo Noguera as patriotic priest's realist sister
 Néstor Cantillana as country bumpkin
 Isabel Parra as Death
 Ángel Parra as Our Lord Jesus Christ
 Miriam Heard as a consular officer
 Luis Villaman as Don Marat the schoolteacher
 José Luis Barba as Cuban schoolteacher

References

Further reading
 Depetris Chauvin, Irene (2015); "Texturas del pasado, performances del presente. Historia y giro afectivo en la rapsodia chilena de Raúl Ruiz" in Cecilia Macón and Mariela Solana (eds.) Pretérito indefinido: Afectos y emociones en las aproximaciones al pasado, Título, pp. 113–135.
 Marinescu, Andreea (2017); "Raúl Ruiz's Surrealist Documentary of Return: Le retour d'un amateur de bibliothèques (1983) and Colfralandes (2002)" in Ignacio López-Vicuña and Andreea Marinescu (eds.) Raúl Ruiz's Cinema of Inquiry, Wayne State University Press, pp. 177–196.
 Rodríguez-Remedi, Alejandra (2009); "Cofralandes: A Formative Space for Chilean Identity" in Miriam Haddu and Joanna Page (eds.) Visual Synergies in Fiction and Documentary Film from Latin America, Palgrave Macmillan, pp. 87–103.
 Thies, Sebastian (2011); "Nomadic Narration and Deterritorialized Nationscape in Cofralandes: Rapsodia chilena (2004) by Raúl Ruiz" in Josef Raab, Sebastian Thies and Daniela Noll-Opitz (eds.) Screening the Americas: Narration of Nation in Documentary, Wissenschaftlicher Verlag Trier, pp. 273–296.

External links
 

2002 films
French comedy-drama films
Chilean comedy-drama films
2000s Spanish-language films
Films directed by Raúl Ruiz
2000s French films